Rayman: Hoodlums' Revenge (alternatively Rayman: Hoodlum's Revenge) is a game that was released for the Game Boy Advance in 2005. It takes place shortly after the events of Rayman 3: Hoodlum Havoc and, like its predecessor, pokes fun at the platform game genre.

Plot
The games begins with Rayman and Globox sleeping in the forest, when Globox's dreams are disturbed by the memory of him swallowing the Black Lum André. He is awakened by a strange sound, and goes off to search for its source (it is possible he was captured by the Hoodlums, since he is later seen in the Bog of Murk, seemingly trapped). Rayman wakes up later on to find Globox missing, and goes off to look for him.

As he journeys onward, Rayman is told by Murfy that the Hoodlums are trying to clone Reflux, the other main rival of Rayman 3, and that the clone is plum juice-powered. Before he finally meets up with Globox, he must destroy the Infernal Machine, which basically makes the potent plum juice.

Meanwhile, in the Bog of Murk, Globox is unknowingly being slowly taken over by André, and this is apparent by Globox's sudden mood swings in which he becomes condescending, aggressive, and just plain mean. Later, when he escapes from prison and reunites with Rayman, André often insults Rayman or the feeble attempts of the Hoodlums ("meddlesome loser" and "Lame-man" being some of the jeers he throws at Rayman). However, Rayman, unused to Globox being a jerk, or smart in any way, simply does not hear most of it, though at one point he asks Globox if he was hit in the head.

As they continue through the lands they must save the Teensies and defeat a couple of bosses. In the Pit of Endless Fire, after the defeat of the Firemonster, André takes full control of Globox and announces his return.

When Rayman finally encounters the cloned Reflux, created from Globox's body, and defeats him, an unconscious Globox appears as Andre's black spirit flutters away through Globox's mouth. Globox awakes his full self, even asking if he missed breakfast and the game ends with the pair walking off into the forest.

Gameplay
This game is the first Rayman game to be of an isometric platformer, instead of being either a fully 3D or 2D platformer. Most of the levels put the player in control of Rayman, while other levels put the player in control of his partner, Globox. In certain levels, the player is able to control both of them in the same level by pressing the Select button to switch the characters.
The goal of each level is to get to the end and gain the maximum number of points possible. To do this, the player has to collect gems and lums that are scattered throughout the levels. Also, freeing Teensies and defeating enemies gives the player points. At the end of the level, the player earns Murfy stamps, based on their score. Murfy stamps are not important to the completion of the game, but after getting a certain number of them, extra levels are unlocked. There is a total of five levels that can be unlocked with the acquiring of Murfy stamps.

Reception

Hoodlum's Revenge received mixed or average reviews, with Metacritic scoring a 61/100, and GameRankings with a 59%. It also got a 6.5 from IGN and a 7.3 from GameSpot. Gamepro magazine gave the game a score of 3/5 praising the game music and sound effects  although criticizing the linear and repetitive gameplay and the isometric camera angle making it difficult to navigate through the levels. Critics appreciated the new isometric play-style, but criticized the game for being too short.

References 

2005 video games
Game Boy Advance games
Game Boy Advance-only games
Platform games
Rayman
Single-player video games
Video game sequels
Video games developed in the United States
Video games with isometric graphics